Enadoline is a drug which acts as a highly selective κ-opioid agonist.

In human studies, it produced visual distortions and feelings of dissociation, reminiscent of the effects of salvinorin A.

It was studied as a potential analgesic, but abandoned because of the dose-limiting effects of dysphoria, which could be expected from a κ-opioid agonist. There was mention of its potential in treating comatose head injury or stroke victims, where that type of side effect would be immaterial.

Potency
When enadoline was first reported in 1990, it was "the most potent κ-selective analgesic ever reported ... 25 times more potent than morphine and 17 times more potent than U-62066".

References

Synthetic opioids
Dissociative drugs
Pyrrolidines
Kappa-opioid receptor agonists
Tetrahydrofurans
Acetamides
Benzofuranethanamines
Spiro compounds
Psychedelic drugs
Abandoned drugs